Vielma is a surname. Notable people with the surname include:

Engelb Vielma (born 1994), Venezuelan baseball player
Leonel Vielma (born 1978), Venezuelan footballer